Country punk may refer to:

Cowpunk: Country music with influences from punk rock and new wave.
Countrycore: Country music with influences from hardcore punk and heavy metal.